Colonel By Drive is an  long scenic parkway in Ottawa, Ontario, Canada named after Colonel John By. It runs along the Rideau Canal from the end of Sussex Drive at Rideau Street. To the north, the road passes Department of National Defence Headquarters, the Ottawa Congress Centre and the Westin Hotel before ending at Wellington Street and Rideau Street. The rear door of the Government Conference Centre can be accessed from the street as well, after it passes under the Mackenzie King Bridge. It is named for Lieutenant-Colonel John By, who built the Rideau Canal.

For many decades the area east of the canal had held Ottawa's main rail lines connecting to the Ottawa Train Station near the northern end of the canal. The National Capital Commission thus decided to create a scenic parkway. The Queen Elizabeth Driveway, another scenic Canadian parkway, already served the same purpose on the other side of the canal.

Like the adjacent Queen Elizabeth Driveway on the other side of the canal, pedestrians and bicycles are a common sight on the paths running alongside Colonel By. Every Sunday, during the summer months, Colonel By is closed to motor vehicle traffic so that bicycles and pedestrians can have the road to themselves.

Roads in Ottawa
Bike paths in Ontario
Parkways in Ontario
National Capital Commission